Julie von Webenau (16 October, 1813 – 2 July, 1887) was a German-Austrian composer.

Life

Julie was a daughter of the government council member Ludwig Cajetan Baroni-Cavalcabò (1765-1847) and the amateur singer Josephine Baroni-Cavalcabò (1788-1860). Born in Lemberg, Austrian Empire (today Lviv, Ukraine). In Lemberg, she was a student of Mozart's son, Franz Xaver Wolfgang Mozart of whom her mother became his lover and sole heir. She had a sister, Laura, and also a brother, Adolf Baroni-Cavalcabò (1809–1847).

Robert Schumann dedicated his Humoresque op. 20 to Julie in 1839. He had already met her in Leipzig in 1835 and renewed his acquaintance in Vienna. Originally he wanted to dedicate the Arabesque op. 18 to her. On March 13, 1839, he wrote about it to his bride Clara Wieck: “The 'arabesque' was given to the Webenau, the 'flower piece' to the Serre, the 'humoresque' - nobody; Strange, I also think of something in my dedications, which should always have a connection with the origin, and could not find anyone, but the world hardly understands the subtleties." 

Julie von Webenau dedicated the composition L'Adieu et le Retour to Schumann as well as her Morceaux de Fantaisie pour Pianoforte op. 25, which was published in March, 1840 by the Leipzig publishing house, Kistner.  According to a review by Schumann in his Neue Zeitschrift für Musik from 1836/37, the names of all female composers could easily be written on a "rose leaf" which alluded to the social conventions of the artistically creative woman's time, as well as her perceived gender role.

Family 
On March 29, 1838, in Lemberg, she married the lawyer, Wilhelm Weber Edler von Webenau (1796–1841), a member of the legislative court commission in Vienna, with whom she moved to Vienna that same year. They had a son, Arthur Weber Edler von Webenau who became the imperial and royal embassy counselor in Constantinople . Her husband died on August 16, 1841. 

In July, 1842 she married the Brazilian Legation Secretary, Dr. Johann Alois Ritter von Britto. The couple had two sons and one daughter. In 1877, her second husband died and she then lived with her sister, Laura Pawlikowska until her death.

Laura Pawlikowska, née Countess Baroni-Cavalcabò (1810-1892), was the wife of the art collector, Johann Gualbert Ritter von Pawlikowsky (1792-1852).

Her granddaughter was the composer, Vilma von Webenau .

Music 

 op. 1 - Variation for piano (May 1830)
 op. 2 - Caprice for piano No. 1
 op. 3 - Piano Sonata in E flat major, published by Breitkopf & Härtel, Leipzig, 1830
 op. 4 - Fantasy in C minor for piano
 op.5 - Introduction et Rondeau for piano (December 1830)
 op. 6 - Die Grabesrose for bass, baritone or alto ("You Grabesrose rooted well"), poem by Anastasius Grün from the sheets of love (November 1837)
 op.8 - Allegro di Bravura for piano (July 1834)
 op. 9 - Farewell!, Poem by Heinrich Heine ("Beautiful cradle of my sorrows"), dedicated to the singer Francilla Pixis (December 1836)
 op. 10 - Three German songs, published by Friedrich Hofmeister, Leipzig 1836

 op. 11 - The Unnamed, poem by Johann Ludwig Uhland ("On the summit of a mountain") (May 1838)
 op.12 - Capriccio No. 2 in A major for piano, dedicated to Sigismund Thalberg (February 1837)
 op. 13 - Equestrian song for bass or baritone ("We walk through life") (May 1837)
 op. 15 - Dispute and Atonement, duet for soprano and bass ("Schnür 'Dein Bund because for hiking"), text by Karl Simrock (November 1837)
 op. 16 - Il rimprovero, song in A flat minor, text by Iacopo Vittorelli, self-published, undated
 op. 17 - It sails gently on silver waves, text by Anastasius Grün (from the leaves of love ) (November 1838)
 op.18 - Caprice for piano No. 3 (February 1838), published by Pietro Mechetti quondam Carlo, Vienna 1838
 op.19 - Fantasy in E minor for piano, published by Artaria, Vienna 1838
 op. 21 - The young man and the nymph ("He stood there pensively, at the hot spring") (April 1838)
 op. 22 - Why?, Lied in D flat major, text by Ludwig Bechstein (“You ask why only complaints”), published by Anton Diabelli, Vienna 1838
 op. 23 - Your picture, text by Franz Freiherr von Dingelstedt, Vienna 1839
 op. 24 - To the Swallows (August 1842)

 op. 25 - L'Adieu et le Retour. Morceaux de Fantaisie pour Pianoforte, dedicated to Robert Schumann (March 1840)
 op. 26 - Au Bord du Lac, Morceau de Salon (May 1843)
 op. 27 - Nocturne (October 1843)
 op. 28 - Morceaux de Salon (September 1844)
 op. 29 - Barcarolle for piano
 op. 30 Two songs, published by AO Witzendorf, Vienna, undated

 Shepherd's Lament, poem by Johann Wolfgang von Goethe, Vienna 1829
 La Chasse
 Own railway (August 1840)
 Ask the moon, cycle of four songs Julie of Webenaus (Why? , Resteigne train, The Modest, The Lead Cherin Night Song), orchestrated by Catherine Blassnigg, Monika Ciernia, Philipp Hribernig and Stefano Penzo (UA Vienna in 2013 by the Academic Symphony Orchestra of the University of Economics, Lt. George Jackson).

References
 Alison Bauld: Mozart's Sister (Alcina Press, 2005), 
 Beate Julia Perrey: The Cambridge Companion to Schumann (Cambridge University Press, 2007), 
 :de:Julie Weber von Webenau

External links
 Classics online
 

1813 births
1887 deaths
19th-century classical composers
19th-century German composers
19th-century women composers
Austrian classical composers
Women classical composers
German Romantic composers